The Exclusive Economic Zone of Malta is a proposed exclusive economic zone by the Government of Malta which will extend Malta's responsibilities by 71,446 km2 beyond territorial waters.

On 12 June 2021 Clyde Caruana, Minister of Finance and Employment, proposed an exclusive economic zone for Malta. Caruana stated that an exclusive economic zone could hold economic potential for "fisheries, artificial islands, wind farms, solar farms, wave-generated electricity and revenue from shipping movements."

See also 

 Geography of Malta

References 

Malta
Borders of Malta
Foreign relations of Malta
Economy of Malta